The canton of Sainte-Geneviève-des-Bois is an administrative division of the Essonne department, Île-de-France region, northern France. Its borders were modified at the French canton reorganisation which came into effect in March 2015. Its seat is in Sainte-Geneviève-des-Bois.

It consists of the following communes:
Morsang-sur-Orge
Sainte-Geneviève-des-Bois
Villemoisson-sur-Orge
Villiers-sur-Orge

References

Cantons of Essonne